During the 1974–75 Dutch football season, PSV Eindhoven competed in the Eredivisie, winning its fifth national title.

Squad

Results

Eredivisie

KNVB Cup

First round

UEFA Cup Winners' Cup

First round

Second round

Quarter-finals

Semi-finals

References
 
 

PSV Eindhoven seasons
Dutch football championship-winning seasons
PSV Eindhoven